This is a complete list of the songs introduced by Fred Astaire beginning with his first Broadway show Over the Top in 1917 (his childhood and teenage period in vaudeville is not covered). Those who co-introduced a song with him are indicated in the co-singer column. The year refers to the year of introduction, not necessarily the year the song was written. The "Date of First Commercial Recording" refers to songs for which Astaire's recording was the first release of the song to the record-buying public.

By default, this list is sorted in alphabetical order by song title; however, since it is a sortable wikitable, it can be sorted on the basis of any column simply by clicking on the symbol next to the column title.

References